Vasily Alexeevich Barkhatov is a Russian stage director.

Early life
Vasily Barkhatov was born in Moscow in 1983. In 2004 he interned at the Komische Oper in Berlin, where he was mentored by producer Peter Konvichniy. A year later, he graduated from the Russian Institute of Theatre Art where he was under guidance from Raissa Nemchinskaya.

Career

Bolshoi Theatre
In 2004, he staged The Diary of One Who Disappeared at the Helikon Opera. In the same year, he performed an operatic duology called The Music Director, as well as Antonio Salieri's Prima la musica e poi le parole and Mozart's Der Schauspieldirektor, the latter two of which were staged at the Rostov State Musical Theatre. In 2009, he staged Les brigands at the Moscow Pushkin Drama Theatre and in 2010 he directed The Umbrellas of Cherbourg at the Karambol Theatre and Die Fledermaus at Bolshoi. In 2011, he directed Perfidy and Love at the Comedian’s Refuge Theatre and directed the film Atomic Ivan. In 2012, he traveled to Lithuania, where he staged Eugene Onegin at the Lithuanian National Opera and Ballet Theatre. Upon returning to Moscow, he staged Die neuen Leiden des jungen W. at the Chekhov Moscow Art Theatre.

Mariinsky Theatre
At Mariinsky Theatre he was a stage and production designer for Moscow, Cheryomushki in 2006 and Janáček's Jenůfa, Berlioz's Benvenuto Cellini and Verdi's Otello in 2007. In 2008, he staged Smelkov's The Brothers Karamazov and Shchedrin's Dead Souls. In 2011 he was a stage director of The Tales of Hoffmann.

In 2012 he, along with Anna Makhova and Dmitry Renansky, announced the creation of the theatre's Modern Opera Lab.

Mikhaylovsky Theatre
In 2011, Mikhaylovsky Theatre director Vladimir Kehman invited Barkhatov to become the theatre's artistic director, a position Barkhatov began in 2013. His first opera project at the theatre was a production of The Flying Dutchman. Barkhatov also staged a gala concert in honor of the theatre's anniversary. Barkhatov announced his resignation from the position in 2014, shortly before his staging of Eugene Onegin opened the theatre's season.

Awards
In 2009, Barkhatov received the Golden Mask award for his staging of The Brothers Karamazov.

References

1983 births
Living people
Russian theatre directors
Recipients of the Golden Mask
Theatre people from Moscow